Terror Trail is a 1921 American silent Western film serial directed by Edward A. Kull. It is considered to be a lost film.

Plot

Cast
 Eileen Sedgwick as Vera Vernon / Elaine Emerson
 George Larkin as Bruce Barnes
 Theodore Brown as Bertram Russell
 Albert J. Smith as Hunch Henderson
 Barney Furey as Holmes
 Pierre Couderc

Chapter titles
The Mystery Girl
False Clues
The Mine of Menace
The Door of Doom
The Bridge of Disaster
The Ship of Surprise
The Palace of Fear
The Peril of the Palace
The Desert of Despair
Sands of Fate
The Menace of the Sea
The Isle of Eternity
The Forest of Fear
The Lure of the Jungle
The Jaws of Death
The Storm of Despair
The Arm of the Law
The Final Reckoning

See also
 List of film serials
 List of film serials by studio
 List of lost films

References

External links

 

1921 films
1921 Western (genre) films
1921 lost films
American silent serial films
American black-and-white films
Films directed by Edward A. Kull
Lost Western (genre) films
Lost American films
Films with screenplays by John Grey
Silent American Western (genre) films
Universal Pictures film serials
Films with screenplays by George H. Plympton
1920s American films
1920s English-language films